Lake Menomin is a reservoir on the Red Cedar River, in Dunn County, Wisconsin, USA.  Its name is derived from the Ojibwe name for this lake, Manoominikaani-zaaga'igan meaning "Abundant with Wild Rice Lake."

Along the lake's western and southern shores lies the city of Menomonie, the central business district of which is located at the far southern end of the lake, near the dam which forms it. There are multiple public parks, trails, beaches, and boat landings along the lake's shoreline. Common fish found in lake Menomin include Panfish, Largemouth and Smallmouth Bass, Northern Pike, and Walleye. Throughout the summer, blue-green algae blooms afflict the lake due to high nutrient levels.

References

External links
  Wolske Bay Association

Menomin
Bodies of water of Dunn County, Wisconsin